Wonder Man is a 1945 musical film directed by H. Bruce Humberstone and starring Danny Kaye and Virginia Mayo. It is based on a short story by Arthur Sheekman, adapted for the screen by a staff of writers led by Jack Jevne and Eddie Moran, and produced by Samuel Goldwyn. Mary Grant designed the film's costumes.

Plot
Danny Kaye plays a double role as a pair of estranged "super-identical twins". Despite their almost indistinguishable looks, the two have very different personalities. Buster Dingle, who goes by the stage name "Buzzy Bellew", is a loud and goofy performer at the Pelican Club, while Edwin Dingle is a studious, quiet bookworm writing a history book. The two brothers have not seen each other for years.

Buster becomes the witness to a murder committed by mob boss "Ten Grand" Jackson and is promptly murdered himself. He comes back as a ghost, calling on his long-lost brother for help to bring the killer to justice. As a result, the shy Edwin must take his brother's place until after his testimony is given.

In the meantime, he has to dodge Jackson's hitmen and fill in for Buster at the nightclub. To help him out, Busterwho cannot be seen or heard by anyone but Edwinpossesses him, with outrageously goofy results.

Edwin, possessed by Buzzy, performs a bit where he pretends to be a famous Russian singer allergic to flowers. A vase of flowers is nonetheless placed on a table near him, and his song, "Otchi Chornya", is frequently interrupted by his loud and goofy-sounding sneezes.

The love interests of the brothers further complicate the situation; while the murdered Buster was engaged to entertainer Midge Mallon, librarian Ellen Shanley admires Edwin.

In the end, Ellen marries Edwin, while Midge consoles herself by marrying the owner of the Pelican Club.

Cast

In addition, an uncredited June Hutton provided the singing voice for Vera-Ellen.

Production credits
 Director – H. Bruce Humberstone 
 Producer – Samuel Goldwyn 
 Writing – Don Hartman, Melville Shavelson and Philip Rapp (screenplay); Jack Jevne and Eddie Moran (adaptation); Arthur Sheekman (original story)
 Cinematography – Victor Milner and William Snyder (directors of photography)
 Music – Sylvia Fine (music and lyrics); Ray Heindorf (musical orchestration and conducting)
 Art direction – Ernst Fegté (art director), McClure Capps (associate art direction), Howard Bristol (set decoration)
 Film editor – Daniel Mandell
 Music – Louis Forbes (musical director)
 Choreography – John Wray
 Costumes – Travis Banton
 Makeup – Robert Stephanoff
 Special effects – John P. Fulton (special photographic effects)
 Technicolor color director – Natalie Kalmus 
 Sound – Fred Lau (sound recorder)

Awards
The film won an Academy Award for Best Special Effects at the 18th Academy Awards in 1946, and was also nominated for Best Original Song, Best Musical Score, and Best Sound Recording.

The film was also entered into the 1946 Cannes Film Festival.

See also
 List of ghost films

References

External links
 
 
 
 
 

1945 films
Films that won the Best Visual Effects Academy Award
Films directed by H. Bruce Humberstone
Films scored by Ray Heindorf
Films scored by Heinz Roemheld
American fantasy comedy films
American crime comedy films
Samuel Goldwyn Productions films
Films based on short fiction
1940s fantasy comedy films
1940s crime comedy films
American ghost films
American musical comedy films
1945 musical comedy films
1940s English-language films
1940s American films